Melnik Peak is the 696 m summit of Melnik Ridge in eastern Livingston Island, South Shetland Islands in Antarctica.  Surmounting Kaliakra Glacier to the north and west, and Struma Glacier to the southeast.  The peak takes its name from Melnik Ridge.

First ascent by Lyubomir Ivanov and Doychin Vasilev from Camp Academia on 28 December 2004, as part of Tangra 2004/05 survey.

Location

Maps
 L.L. Ivanov et al. Antarctica: Livingston Island and Greenwich Island, South Shetland Islands. Scale 1:100000 topographic map. Sofia: Antarctic Place-names Commission of Bulgaria, 2005.
 L.L. Ivanov. Antarctica: Livingston Island and Greenwich, Robert, Snow and Smith Islands. Scale 1:120000 topographic map.  Troyan: Manfred Wörner Foundation, 2009.

Notes

References
 Melnik Peak. SCAR Composite Antarctic Gazetteer
 Bulgarian Antarctic Gazetteer. Antarctic Place-names Commission. (details in Bulgarian, basic data in English)

External links
 Melnik Peak. Copernix satellite image

Mountains of Livingston Island